Helith Network (or just "Helith") is a hacker collective active since 1999 and is a globally spread community. It is suspected that Helith is affiliated to specialists in the field of malware and network security.

Name

The origin of the name came from accident German where the word Helith means "Heroes". It was chosen because the group beliefs that nobody cares for those who are poor or those who did not had the same chances like studied hackers. It was also chosen to point out that the members just do what they are ready to do even if it conflicts with laws or civil restrictions like beliefs or ethics.

The origin of the name may be traced to the fact that "Helith" was founded in Germany and thus accident German was chosen for the group name. Some of the founding members of Helith shared a belief and talked during a Chaos Communication Congress Congress in 1998-1999 in Germany at an improved round table conference about what needs to get done to reach this goal. At the conference Rembrandt was chosen to be the public link for Helith and thus making him the poster child and victim for federal forces. It is not known who is member of "Helith" nor how many members do exist or what they do in detail because very few information get public and Rembrandt itself is a very problematic character like Theo de Raadt.

History
Helith was founded in 1998-1999 in the Berlin area as a location for its members to share information without judging anybody about how they make their living or for whom they work. Their computer hardware and work on various projects like John the Ripper (partly SSE2 code, porting to OpenBSD), metasploit, medusa, hydra or nmap. In time, the members of "Helith" released several security advisories affecting even the most secure OpenSource Operating System OpenBSD, PF firewall, OpenSSH, NetBSD and vendors like Netgear or Nortel. On July 30, 2007, Washington Post reporter Brian Krebs wrote an article partly about "Helith" cracking the Deutsche Bank internal network.

The global links of Helith reach least from Germany where it was founded, to Russia, Romania, Columbia, several African countries and the USA.

Members
Helith Network membership varied but included at various times:
 benkei,
 ConCode,
 Cyneox,
 Rembrandt,
 Rott_En,
 noptrix,
 Skyout,
 Zarathu

A lot other members might be active but are not disclosed.
The list was created during research with Google and visiting the Helith-Website.

External links
 Washington Post article 
 Current Helith Website 
 ExploitDB posted Advisory of Helith about PF 
 NetBSD security Advisory about a Bug in PF 
 ExploitDB posted Advisory of Helith about a common WiMax router 

Hacker groups